Mangat Dingrian is a village in Shaheed Bhagat Singh Nagar district of Punjab State, India. The village is administrated by Sarpanch an elected representative of the village.

Demography 
As of 2011, Mangat Dhingrian has a total number of 251 houses and population of 1231 of which 656 include are males while 575 are females according to the report published by Census India in 2011. The literacy rate of Mangat Dhingrian is 81.72%, higher than the state average of 75.84%. The population of children under the age of 6 years is 115 which is 9.34% of total population of Mangat Dhingrian, and child sex ratio is approximately 1018 as compared to Punjab state average of 846.

Most of the people are from Schedule Caste which constitutes 53.94% of total population in Mangat Dhingrian. The town does not have any Schedule Tribe population so far.

As per the report published by Census India in 2011, 424 people were engaged in work activities out of the total population of Mangat Dhingrian which includes 376 males and 48 females. According to census survey report 2011, 83.49% workers describe their work as main work and 16.51% workers are involved in Marginal activity providing livelihood for less than 6 months.

Education 
The village has a Punjabi medium, co-ed primary school established in 1978. The school provide mid-day meal as per Indian Midday Meal Scheme. As per Right of Children to Free and Compulsory Education Act the school provide free education to children between the ages of 6 and 14. The village also has an privet un-aided Punjab medium, co-ed primary with upper primary and secondary/higher secondary school.

Amardeep Singh Shergill Memorial college Mukandpur and Sikh National College Banga are the nearest colleges.

List of schools nearby:
Govt Senior Secondary School, Ladhana Jhikka
Dashmesh Model School, Kahma
Govt High School, Jhander Kalan
Govt Gigh School, Khan Khana
Guru Ram Dass Public School, Cheta

Transport 

See also 
List of villages in India

References

External links 
 Tourism of Punjab
 Census of Punjab
 Locality Based PINCode

Villages in Shaheed Bhagat Singh Nagar district